is the 41st studio album by Japanese singer-songwriter Miyuki Nakajima, released in November 2015.

Track listing
All songs written and composed by Miyuki Nakajima and arranged by Ichizo Seo.
"" – 5:25
"" – 4:40
"" – 6:11
""" – 6:17
"" – 5:10
"" – 7:40
"" – 4:51
"Why & No" – 4:16
"" – 5:01
"LADY JANE" – 6:18

Personnel
Miyuki Nakajima – Lead vocals

References

Miyuki Nakajima albums
2015 albums